Solar River Project is a proposed photovoltaic power station planned to be built near Robertstown in South Australia. The project received development approval from the Government of South Australia in June 2018 and was expected to start construction early in 2019. However, the project was still proposed to be constructed, but work on site was not expected until at least the second half of 2022.

The company developing it is based at the University of Adelaide's venture incubator, ThincLab. The project has the support of the Ngadjuri people and the Regional Council of Goyder.

Stage 1 includes 200 MW of solar photovoltaic electricity generation and a 120 MW·h lithium ion battery system and was proposed to start construction early in 2019, generating its first generation before the end of the same year. Stage 2 is proposed to provide another 200 MW of generation and a 150 MW·h battery.

Downer Group was engaged in January 2019 for early contractor involvement, with construction expected to commence in July 2019 and stage 1 to take two years to build. The project had provision for three more stages, depending on market and network conditions. In July, the project's website said that construction would  start in the fourth quarter of 2019. By November 2019, this had slipped to the first quarter of 2020.

Alinta Energy had committed to buy 75% of the solar farm's output for 15 years, however that contract expired due to delays in the project caused by issues such as the withdrawal of Downer Group as EPC contractor.

The grid-connected battery will be supplied by GE Renewable Energy. It is expected to be 100MW/300MWh, larger than any grid-connected batteries in the world at the time of its announcement in 2019.

References

Solar power stations in South Australia
Proposed solar power stations in Australia